Nicholas Roy Welch (born 5 February 1998) is a Zimbabwean cricketer who played for Mashonaland Eagles. After playing domestic cricket in Zimbabwe, he moved to England, signing to play for Leicestershire County Cricket Club in September 2020. In the same month, he also gained UK citizenship.

In March 2019, he played for Loughborough MCCU in a first-class match against Leicestershire, as part of the Marylebone Cricket Club University fixtures. He made his Twenty20 debut on 13 September 2020, for Leicestershire in the 2020 t20 Blast.

In December 2020, he was selected to play for the Mountaineers in the 2020–21 Logan Cup in Zimbabwe.

References

External links
 

1998 births
Living people
Zimbabwean cricketers
Leicestershire cricketers
Loughborough MCCU cricketers
Mashonaland Eagles cricketers
Alumni of St. John's College (Harare)
Sportspeople from Harare